Hugot is a French surname. Notable people with the name include:

 Claude Hugot (1929–1978), French chess player
 Eugène Hugot (1819–1903), French playwright and chansonnier
 Émile Hugot (1904–1993), French sugar technologist
 Emmanuel Hugot (born 1981), French astrophysicist

French-language surnames